Higgins Aircraft was a subsidiary of Higgins Industries set up to build aircraft during World War II. It manufactured war materials at the sprawling Michoud plant in northeastern New Orleans.

Higgins Aircraft was contracted to build the all-plywood-construction Curtiss-Wright C-76 Caravan, and later, the C-46 Commando, but both contracts were cancelled at an early stage, and the company managed to complete only two C-46A aircraft before production shut down. The Commando contract was cancelled on 10 August 1944. Before the government repossessed the factory complex, Higgins managed to finish a helicopter of early design in 1946.  The Higgins factory complex was subsequently subdivided and sold at auction.

References

 

Defunct aircraft manufacturers of the United States
Defunct helicopter manufacturers of the United States